The second legislative assembly election to the Madras state (presently Tamil Nadu) was held on 31 March 1957. This was the first election held after the linguistic reorganization of Madras state in 1954. Indian National Congress and its leader K. Kamaraj won the election, and defeated its rival Dravida Munnetra Kazhagam.  In 1954, due to the resignation of C. Rajagopalachari, for his controversial Kula Kalvi Thittam, the leadership of Congress was contested, between K. Kamaraj, and C. Subramaniam (who got the support of M. Bhaktavatsalam). Eventually, K. Kamaraj, won the support of the party, was elected leader and chief minister of Madras State in 1954.  In a surprise move, he appointed both M. Bhaktavatsalam and C. Subramaniam, in his cabinet, allowing great unity amongst Congress, that ruled the state of Madras, for the next decade. This election saw future DMK leaders, M. Karunanidhi and K. Anbazhagan winning their first MLA seat in the legislative assembly.

Delimitation and reorganisation
On 1 October 1953, a separate Andhra State consisting of the Telugu-speaking areas of the composite Madras State was formed and the Kannada-speaking area of Bellary District was merged with the then Mysore State. This reduced the strength of the Legislative Assembly to 231.

On 1 November 1956, the States Reorganisation Act 1956 took effect and consequently the constituencies in the erstwhile Malabar district were merged with the Kerala State. This further reduced the strength to 190. The Tamil-speaking area of Kerala (present day Kanyakumari district) and Shenkottah taluk were added to Madras State.

According to the new Delimitation of Parliamentary and Assembly Constituencies Order 1956, made by the Delimitation Commission of India under the provisions of the State Reorganisation Act, 1956, the strength of the Madras Legislative Assembly was increased to 205. The 1957 elections were conducted for these 205 seats. In 1959, as result of The Andhra Pradesh and Madras (Alteration of Boundaries) Act 1959, one member from the Andhra Pradesh Legislative Assembly was allotted to Madras increasing its Legislative Assembly strength to 206.

Two member constituencies
Out of the total 167 constituencies in the state, 38 were two member constituencies 37 of which had one reserved for Scheduled caste candidates and 1 for Scheduled tribe candidate. These constituencies were larger in size and had greater number of voters (more than 1,00,000) when compared to general constituencies. Two separate list of candidates, a general list and a reserved list, contested in those constituencies. Each voter had to cast two votes - one for each list.

The two winners were chosen as follows:

 Reserved Member - Candidate with the most votes among the reserved (SC/ST) list candidates
 General Member - Candidate with the most votes among the rest of the candidates excluding the Reserved Member (including both reserved and general lists).

This system led to anomalies. In some cases like the Coimbatore - II constituency in the 1957 election, both elected members belonged to the reserved list - the candidate with second highest number of votes in reserved list secured more votes than the highest vote getter in the general list. Multiple members were elected only in the 1952 and 1957 elections as double member representation was abolished in 1961 by the enactment of Two-Member Constituencies Abolition Act (1961).

Parties and issues
Indian National Congress, Communist Party of India, Forward Bloc, Praja Socialist Party, Socialist Party, Congress Reform Committee (Indian National Democratic Congress) and Dravida Munnetra Kazhagam (DMK) were the major parties contesting this election. This was the first election contested by the DMK since its formation in 1949. The decision to contest elections was taken in 1956 at the party's Trichy conference. The party fielded its candidates in 8 Parliamentary and 117 assembly seats as independents, since it was not an officially recognised party. The increased Tamilian character of the Congress party after the appointment of K. Kamaraj, a non-Brahman as Chief Minister of Tamil Nadu, robbed DMK of its main electoral plank as the sole proponent of Tamil nationalism. It increasingly changed its focus to economic issues and slower industrialisation of the South as an election issue. The DMK election manifesto had a socialist image and creation of Dravida Nadu became a side issue as it had implicitly accepted the prevailing constitutional order.

Periyar E. V. Ramasamy issued a statement in support of K. Kamaraj before the commencement of the election. In October 1956, the central executive of Dravidar Kazhagam resolved to support K. Kamaraj.

Since Mr. Kamaraj has done his best to serve the Tamilians, since he has changed Acharyar's educational system designed to perpetuate the caste system, since he has conferred many jobs and many benefits on Tamilians in the educational and other spheres and since the Brahman and DMK people are trying to oust him from power, it has become the duty of all Tamilians to support Mr. Kamaraj and his followers in the electionThe Hindu (10 October 1956)

K. Kamaraj accepted the support of Dravidar kazhagam and said if the Kazhagam canvassed vote for him out of their own free will, he could not possibly tell them he did not want their votes. He also made it clear that Congress party can not support a party which is communal in nature and he did not in any way share E. V. Ramasamy's views.

K. Kamaraj's decision to accept the support and provide candidacy to some former members of Dravidar Kazhagam caused division within Congress resulting in a new party called, Congress Reform Committee (CRC). Though the party was created in the last moment, it fielded candidates in 12 parliamentary and 55 assembly seats.

Voting and results
Source: Election Commission of India

!colspan=9|
|- style="background-color:#E9E9E9; text-align:center;"
! class="unsortable" |
! Political party !! Flag !! Seats  Contested !! Won !! % of  Seats
! Votes !! Vote % !! Change in vote %
|- style="background: #90EE90;"
| 
| style="text-align:left;" |Indian National Congress
|  
| 204 || 151 (1) || 73.66 || 50,46,576 || 45.34 ||  10.46
|-
| 
| style="text-align:left;" |Communist Party of India
| 
| 58 || 4 (58) || 1.95 || 8,23,582 || 7.40 ||  5.78
|-
| 
| style="text-align:left;" |Praja Socialist Party
|
| 23 || 2 (New) || 0.98 || 2,93,778 || 2.64 || New
|-
| 
|
| 602 || 48 ( 14) || 23.41 || 49,67,060 || 44.62 || N/A
|- class="unsortable" style="background-color:#E9E9E9"
! colspan = 3|
! style="text-align:center;" |Total Seats !! 205 (170) !! style="text-align:center;" |Voters !! 2,39,05,575 !! style="text-align:center;" |Turnout !! colspan = 2|1,11,30,996 (46.56%)
|}

DMK was not officially recognized as a party by the Election commission of India until 1962, so they were registered as an Independent party.  Congress Reform Committee was the second and Dravida Munnetra Kazhagam was the third party in the assembly. Congress won 45% vote share, CRC 8% and DMK 14%.

By constituency

Kamaraj's second cabinet 
Kamaraj's council of ministers during his second tenure as chief minister (1 April 1957 – 1 March 1962)

See also 
 Elections in Tamil Nadu
 Legislature of Tamil Nadu
 Government of Tamil Nadu

Footnotes and references

External links
 Election Commission of India
 1957 Election

State Assembly elections in Tamil Nadu
Madras
1950s in Madras State
March 1957 events in Asia